Loitz is a town in the Vorpommern-Greifswald district, in Mecklenburg-Western Pomerania, Germany. It is situated on the river Peene, 10 km northeast of Demmin, and 22 km southwest of Greifswald.

The German local historian, philologist and publisher Erich Gülzow was born in Loitz.

References

External links

Official website

Vorpommern-Greifswald
1240s establishments in the Holy Roman Empire
1242 establishments in Europe